Lamyctes coeculus is a species of centipede in the Henicopidae family. It was first described in 1844 by French myriapodologist Henry Wilfred Brolemann.

Distribution
The species has been recorded from a geographically widespread suite of sites, including Africa, Europe, Australia and South America. The type locality is Milan in Italy.

Behaviour
The centipedes are solitary terrestrial predators that inhabit plant litter and soil.

References

 

 
coeculus
Centipedes of Australia
Arthropods of Africa
Arthropods of South America
Myriapods of Europe
Fauna of Lord Howe Island
Animals described in 1889
Taxa named by Henry Wilfred Brolemann